Reiszerpeton is an extinct genus of dissorophid temnospondyl known from the Early Permian Archer City Formation of Texas. It is known solely from the holotype, MCZ 1911, a complete skull. This specimen was originally referred to the amphibamiform Tersomius texensis. A reappraisal of the holotype of T. texensis and a number of other referred specimens by Maddin et al. (2013) noted a number of differences from both T. texensis and amphibamiforms more broadly that suggested affinities with the Dissorophidae. This was confirmed by a phylogenetic analysis, which placed it as the sister taxon to the Eucacopinae (Cacops + Zygosaurus + Kamacops). Reiszerpeton is known only from the type species, R. renascentis, which was named for Canadian paleontologist Robert Reisz. The species name refers to the recognition of Reisz as a "renaissance paleontologist." It is differentiated from other dissorophids by its small size, small and more numerous maxillary teeth, smooth cranial ornamentation, and greater distance between the orbit and the otic notch.

Phylogeny 
Below is the 50% majority rule consensus tree from Maddin et al. (2013):

References

Dissorophids
Cisuralian temnospondyls of North America
Permian geology of Texas
Fossil taxa described in 2013
Prehistoric amphibian genera
Paleontology in Texas